The 1995–96 La Liga season, the 65th since its establishment, started on September 9, 1995, and finished on May 26, 1996.



Team information

Clubs and locations

Notes
 With Mérida's promotion every Spanish autonomous community (though not every province) has been represented in Primera División.
 Initially, only 20 teams would play this season in Primera División, but Sevilla FC and Celta de Vigo were relegated to Segunda División B for not making their payments to the Royal Spanish Football Federation. Then, Albacete and Real Valladolid, initially relegated, were readmitted in Primera División. Later, Sevilla FC and Celta de Vigo were also readmitted and the league was expanded to 22 teams for two seasons.
 From this season on, wins were awarded 3 points instead of 2 (similar to other domestic leagues that had 3-1-0 team scoring point format).

League table

Positions by round

Source: LFP 1–4 5–8 9–12 13–16 17–20 21–22

Note: UEFA Cup Winners' Cup spot (in yellow) being non-related with a position in La Liga, does not appear until the winner is assured to not win La Liga, thus if wins La Liga has a spot in the UEFA Champions League, then 1995–96 Copa del Rey runners-up earns a spot in the 1996–97 UEFA Cup Winners' Cup. Atlético Madrid won their 9th La Liga title in the last matchday, so after matchday 42 Barcelona's places are coloured in yellow. In light yellow the spot expected for 1996–97 UEFA Cup Winners' Cup.

Results

Relegation playoff

First Leg

Second Leg

Pichichi Trophy

Signings
 Source: http://www.bdfutbol.com/

References

External links
Spanish La Liga Football Squads (1995–1996)

1995 1996
1995–96 in Spanish football leagues
Spain